İmdat Sütlüoğlu (born 2 October 1953) is a Turkish politician and administrator. He is the chairman and CEO of the ÇAYKUR (General Directorate of Tea Enterprises) since 26 April 2011.

He served as a Member of Parliament for Rize from Justice and Development Party (AKP) between 2002 and 2007. He was Minister of Environment at Cabinet Gül. He also was the Mayor of Ardeşen between 1994–2002.

References 

1953 births
Living people
Welfare Party politicians
Virtue Party politicians
Justice and Development Party (Turkey) politicians
Members of the 22nd Parliament of Turkey
Turkish Sunni Muslims
Mayors of places in Turkey
People from Ardeşen